Briec (formerly Briec-de-l'Odet) is a commune in the Finistère department in the region of Brittany in north-western France.

Sights
Calvary at Saint-Vennec, (1556)
Chapelle de la Madeleine, 16th century
Chapelle de Sainte-Cécile 16th century
Chapelle Notre-Dame d'Illijour 19th century
Chapelle Saint-Corentin 16th century
Chapelle Saint-Égarec 16th century
Chapelle Saint-Sébastien 16th century
Chapelle Saint-Venec 16th century
Saint-Pierre parish church, 15th century

List of mayors
Jean-Hubert Pétillon 2014
Jean-Paul Le Pann 2001/2014
Joseph Bernard 1989/2001
François Rolland 1981/1989
Pierre Stephan 1959/1981
Yves Le Page 1945/1959
Jean Pennarun 1941/1945
Hervé Merour 1929/1941
Pierre Kerbourc'h 1925/1929
Jean Pennarun 1919/1925
Michel Croissant 1908/1919
Jean Pennarun 1906/1908
Michel Croissant 1904/1906
Hervé Le Gac 1882/1904
Pierre Dandurand 1878/1882
Jean Bozec 1857/1878
Jean Rolland 1855/1857
Jean Kerbourch 1848/1855
Hervé Le Berre 1827/1848
François CreachcadicC 1806/1827
Yves Le Gougay 1803/1806
Jean Le Louet 1801/1803
     Le Hénaff 1796/1801
     Le Gougay 1794/1796
François Ducap 1793/1794
Yves Le Grand 01-1793/07-1793
Henry Hémon 01-1792/01-1793
Jean Pennanech 11-1791/12-1791

International relations
Twinned with Ruthin, Wales.

Population
Inhabitants of Briec are called in French Briecois.

Breton language
In 2008, 7.77% of primary-school children attended bilingual schools.

See also
Communes of the Finistère department
 The Briec monument aux morts has sculpture by Pierre Charles Lenoir
Listing of the works of the Maître de Laz

References

External links

 Official website

 Mayors of Finistère Association  

Communes of Finistère